Howard Page Cross (August 23, 1910 – August 28, 1975) was an architect who practiced in New York City, active between the years 1945–1975. He was notable for having designed in the classical manner during a time when most American architects had abandoned it in favor of modernism.

Early life and education
Page Cross was born in 1910 and grew up in New York City, the son of John Walter Cross, an architect in the firm Cross and Cross. He graduated from the Groton School (1928) Yale College (Bachelor of Arts, 1932) and the Massachusetts Institute of Technology (Bachelor of Architecture, 1936), and served in the armed forces during World War II as a major in the Marine Corps.

He worked in partnership with his father, as Cross and Son, until 1951, and after his father's death as Page Cross Architect.

Cross died on August 28, 1975, at Lenox Hill Hospital, New York City, following heart surgery.

Architectural works

 Music Building, Foxcroft School (completed 1948).
 Schoolhouse, Foxcroft School (completed 1951).
 Paul and Bunny Mellon Residence, Rokeby Road, Upperville, Virginia (completed 1955).
 Paul and Bunny Mellon Residence, Oyster Harbors Island, Osterville, Massachusetts.
 Trinity Episcopal Church, Upperville, Virginia (completed 1960).
 Addition to the Andrew Mellon Library, Choate Rosemary Hall, Wallingford, Connecticut (completed 1960; 1924 library designed by Edward Purcell Mellon).
 Center for Hellenic Studies, Washington, DC (completed 1963).
 Paul and Bunny Mellon Townhouse, 125 East 70th Street, New York City (completed 1966).
 Paul and Bunny Mellon Residence, Mill Reef Club, Antigua, completed 1968.
 Harding and Mary Lawrence Residence, East End Avenue, New York City (completed 1973 with Billy Baldwin).
 Southampton, NY residence (Completed 1973 with interior designer Anthony Hail).
 Neil McConnell Residence, 8–12 Sutton Square, New York City (alterations 1973).

Gallery

External links

References

American neoclassical architects
Yale College alumni
MIT School of Architecture and Planning alumni
1910 births
1975 deaths
Architects from New York City
20th-century American architects
Groton School alumni